Josiah Mushore Chinamano (October 29, 1922 – 1984) fought in the Rhodesian Bush War as a guerrilla of the Zimbabwe African People's Union. He later served as the Minister of Transport.

Chinamano was second-in-command to Joshua Nkomo, and shared many of the same ideological and political beliefs. The two, along with Chinamano's wife Ruth, Joseph Msika, another leadership figure in the struggle, and Daniel Madzimbamuto, one of the longest serving detainees, and Paul Tangi Mhova Mkondo were detained by the Smith administration in 1964. Their influential role at the forefront of the movement proved threatening to the Rhodesian government; the five leaders spent several years in Gonakudzingwa Restriction Camp, separated from their young families. Political pressure on the Smith administration resulted in their release; Chinamano resumed his political career.

Chinamano died in 1984 and was buried in the National Heroes Acre in Harare.

References

1922 births
1984 deaths
People of the Central Intelligence Agency
Zimbabwe People's Revolutionary Army personnel
ZANU–PF politicians
Prisoners and detainees of Rhodesia